Adam Mednick (born 9 September 1966) is a Swedish professional golfer.

Early life
Mednick was born in Bethesda, Maryland in the United States to an American father and a Swedish mother, and moved to Sweden when he was eight years old. His great-grandparents emigrated from Kiev in the Ukraine, and the authorities in the United States changed their family name from Mednikov to Mednick.

Amateur career
Mednick had a successful amateur career, representing Gävle Golf Club, situated 180 kilometres north of Stockholm, Sweden, in the same player generation as club mates, European Tour winner to be, Peter Hedblom and 1988 Amateur Championship winner Cristian Härdin. When Härdin became the first Swede to play in The Masters Tournament at Augusta National Golf Club in April 1989, Mednick caddied for him. Mednick also caddied for Härdin at the 1988 Amateur Championship triumph, after Mednick had lost and been kicked out from the tournament in an early round.

Mednick lost in the final of the 1984 Boys Amateur Championship against Lee Vannet, Scotland, 2 and 1 at Royal Portcawl Golf Club, Wales.

Mednick represented Sweden at the 1984 European Boys' Team Championship at Royal St George's Golf Club, England, as one of the five best male players up to 18 years of age in Sweden, in the same team as future Ryder Cup-player Per-Ulrik Johansson.

In June 1986, Mednick won the  Scottish Youth Championship at Cawder Golf Club, Glasgow, with a score of 282, nine strokes ahead of the nearest competitor.

In 1986, Mednick began at college in Jacksonville, Florida, to combine studies with golf training, but left school after the first year and moved back to Sweden.

Mednick was a candidate to be selected for the Swedish team at the 1988 Eisenhower Trophy on home soil in Stockholm, but did not make the team and turned professional before the 1989 season.

Professional career
In 1990, Mednick won the most prestigious title on the Swedish Golf Tour, the Swedish PGA Championship, that year named Länsförsäkringar Open and also part of the Challenge Tour. Mednick finished second on the 1990 Swedish Golf Tour Order of Merit. After winning the Swedish PGA Championship again in 1996, this time named the Compaq Open, as well as the 1996 Swedish Match-play Championship, he finished the 1996 season on top of the Swedish Golf Tour Order of Merit.

Mednick played on the European Tour and the second tier Challenge Tour between 1990 and 2006 but his career was restricted by a back injury sustained in 1995.

He won one tournament at the top level, the 2002 North West of Ireland Open at Ballyliffin, Ireland, which was dual-ranked with the European Tour and the Challenge Tour. Mednick became the 18th Swedish winner on the European Tour with the 47th victory by a Swedish player.

On 18 October 2002, Mednick achieved a career highest world ranking of 295.

In 2008, Mednick coached the successful European Palmer Cup team together with Mårten Olander.

Mednick made his debut on the European Senior Tour at the inaugural Paris Legends Championship the same day he turned 50, making him eligible for the competition at Le Golf National. His former room-mate and compatriot Magnus Persson Atlevi would go on to secure his first Senior Tour title at the tournament.

Personal life
Mednick competes on the senior tour as Adam Mednickson. After his career on the European Tour he married Tullia Johansson. The couple considered calling themselves Mednick-Johansson until their 4-year-old son Tom suggested the more easy to pronounce portmanteau of Mednickson, which became the family's legal name.

After his playing career on the regular tour, Mednick found interest in playing golf with hickory sticks. He has attended the Swedish Hickory Championship several times and twice finished second.

Mednick has worked with golf course design together with Pierre Fulke, former tournament professional and one of Sweden's most respected golf course architects.

Amateur wins
1986 Scottish Youths Amateur Championship

Professional wins (7)

European Tour wins (1)

1Dual-ranking event with the Challenge Tour

Challenge Tour wins (6)

1Dual-ranking event with the European Tour

Swedish Golf Tour wins (1)

Results in major championships

Note: Mednick only played in The Open Championship.

CUT = missed the half-way cut
"T" = tied

Team appearances
Amateur
Jacques Léglise Trophy (representing the Continent of Europe): 1984
European Boys' Team Championship (representing Sweden): 1984

See also
1996 PGA Tour Qualifying School graduates
List of golfers with most Challenge Tour wins

References

External links

Adam Mednick at golfdata.se 

American male golfers
Swedish male golfers
European Tour golfers
PGA Tour golfers
European Senior Tour golfers
Swedish people of American descent
American emigrants to Sweden
Swedish people of Russian descent
American people of Russian descent
People from Bethesda, Maryland
Sportspeople from Lund
1966 births
Living people